"Love, Me" is a song written by Skip Ewing and Max T. Barnes, and recorded by American country music artist Collin Raye.  It was released in October 1991 as the second single from the album All I Can Be.  In January 1992, the single became Raye's first Number One single on the U.S. Billboard Hot Country Singles & Tracks charts; the same year, the song received a Song of the Year nomination from the Country Music Association. The single has been cited as a popular choice for funerals.

Content
"Love, Me" is a ballad in the key of C major, accompanied by Fender Rhodes electric piano and steel-string acoustic guitar. It tells of a couple who promise to love each other. The song's narrator tells of being with his grandfather, and reading a note that was written by his late grandmother back when both grandparents were younger. The grandfather explains that he had intended to meet her at a certain tree: "If you get there before I do, don't give up on me / I'll meet you when my chores are through, I don't know how long I'll be / But I'm not gonna let you down, darling, wait and see / And between now and then, 'til I see you again, I'll be loving you / Love, me." In the second verse, the narrator and his grandfather are at a church where they stopped to pray just before the late grandmother died, and the grandfather reads the note and begins to cry, that is the first time that he ever saw his grandfather crying in all his fifteen years.

Music video
The music video was directed by Peter Lippman and premiered in late 1991.

Chart positions

Year-end charts

References

1991 singles
1991 songs
Collin Raye songs
Songs written by Skip Ewing
Songs written by Max T. Barnes
Epic Records singles